Palmitoyl-protein thioesterase 1 (PPT-1), also known as palmitoyl-protein hydrolase 1, is an enzyme that in humans is encoded by the PPT1 gene.

Function 
PPT-1 a member of the palmitoyl protein thioesterase family.  PPT-1 is a small glycoprotein involved in the catabolism of lipid-modified proteins during lysosomal degradation. This enzyme removes thioester-linked fatty acyl groups such as palmitate from cysteine residues.

Clinical significance 

Defects in this gene are a cause of neuronal ceroid lipofuscinosis type 1 (CLN1).

References

Further reading
Acyl-protein thioesterase

External links 
  GeneReviews/NCBI/NIH/UW entry on Neuronal Ceroid-Lipofuscinosis

EC 3.1.2